Just Jaeckin (8 August 1940 – 6 September 2022) was a French film director, photographer, and sculptor.

Early life
Jaeckin was born in Vichy, Allier, French State during the Second World War, but left with his mother and father for England. Following the end of hostilities, he returned to France where he studied art and photography, before and after serving with the French Army: while with the army, he shot photographs as commissioned.

Film career
Jaeckin debuted with Emmanuelle in 1974, starring Sylvia Kristel, a French softcore film which began a series. In 1975 he directed Histoire d'O (English title: Story of O), starring Corinne Cléry. The film met with far less acclaim than the book. It was banned in the United Kingdom by the British Board of Film Censors until February 2000.

A version of Lady Chatterley's Lover (1981) followed. Featuring Kristel, Shane Briant, and Nicholas Clay. The film gained widespread publicity owing to its explicit nature, but received generally poor reviews and was only a moderate commercial success.

The Perils of Gwendoline in the Land of the Yik-Yak (original title Gwendoline) was released in 1984, starring Tawny Kitaen. The film is loosely based on the bondage-themed comics of John Willie and on the figure of Gwendoline. François Schuiten worked as a graphic designer for the movie.

A 1986 article in the Los Angeles Times linked Jaeckin and actress Mary Louise Weller to "an upcoming French film."

Jaeckin later retired from making films. He lived in France with his wife Anne and continued to do photography and sculpture.

Filmography

As director

Theatrical releases
Emmanuelle (1974)
Histoire d'O (The Story of O) (1975)
Madame Claude (1977)
Le dernier amant romantique (English title The Last Romantic Lover) (1978)
Collections privées (English title Private Collections) (1979)
Girls (1980)
Lady Chatterley's Lover (1981)
The Perils of Gwendoline in the Land of the Yik-Yak (1984)

Television releases
Salut champion, episode Formule 1 (1981)
Salut champion, episode Moto story (1981)

As writer
Le dernier amant romantique (English title The Last Romantic Lover) (1978)
Girls (1980)
Lady Chatterley's Lover (1981)
The Perils of Gwendoline in the Land of the Yik-Yak (1984)

References

External links
 Galerie Anne & Just Jaeckin
 
 
 

1940 births
2022 deaths
People from Vichy
French film directors